Marina Grigoryeva (born 10 July 1973) is a Russian sports shooter. She competed in the women's 10 metre air rifle event at the 1996 Summer Olympics.

References

1973 births
Living people
Russian female sport shooters
Olympic shooters of Russia
Shooters at the 1996 Summer Olympics
Sportspeople from Moscow